Sam Bates may refer to:
 Sam Bates (rugby league), English rugby league footballer
 Sam Bates (cricketer), English cricketer
 Samantha Bates, Australian cricketer

See also
 Samuel Bates (disambiguation)